Vélingara Department is one of the 46 departments of Senegal, one of the three making up the Kolda Region in the Upper Casamance.

Administration 

The department has three communes: Vélingara (the capital town), Kounkané and Diaobé-Kabendou.

The rural districts (Communautés rurales) comprise:
 Bonconto Arrondissement
 Bonconto (Bonkonto)
 Linkéring
 Médina Gounass
 Sinthiang Koundara
 Pakour Arrondissement
 Pakour
 Paroumba
 Ouassadou
 Saré Coly Sallé Arrondissement, created in 2008
 Saré Coly Sallé
 Kandia
 Kandiaye 
 Némataba

Population 

In the December 2002 census, the population was 189,742. In 2005, it was estimated at 206,547 people.

Historical site
 Village of Payoungou, arrondissement of Pakour

Notable people
 Cherif Mohamed Aly Aidara, founder of the NGO Mozdahir International Institute

References

Departments of Senegal
Kolda Region